The Idiot is a 2011 Estonian drama film directed by Rainer Sarnet and based on the 1869 novel of the same name by Fyodor Dostoyevsky.

Cast
 Risto Kübar as Myshkin
 Katariina Unt as Nastasja Filippovna
 Tambet Tuisk as Rogozin
 Ragne Veensalu as Aglaja
 Ain Lutsepp as Jepantsin
 Ülle Kaljuste as Jelizaveta
 Tiina Tauraite as Aleksandra
 Sandra Üksküla-Uusberg as Adelaida
 Kaido Veermäe as Ganja
 Juhan Ulfsak as Ippolit
 Roman Baskin as Totski
 Taavi Eelmaa as Lebedev
 Liina Vahtrik as Varja

References

External links
 

2011 films
2011 drama films
Estonian-language films
Films based on The Idiot
Estonian drama films